Coptotriche aenea is a moth of the family Tischeriidae. It is found in North America, including Nova Scotia, Ontario, Arkansas, Connecticut, the District of Columbia, Florida, Kentucky, Mississippi, New Jersey, Ohio, Oklahoma, Pennsylvania, Texas and West Virginia.

The larvae feed on Rubus allegheniensis, Rubus flagellaris, Rubus frondosus, Rubus occidentalis and Rubus villosus. They mine the leaves of their host plant.

References

Moths described in 1873
Tischeriidae